Euxoa homicida is a moth of the family Noctuidae. It is found in Turkey, Armenia and north-western Pakistan.

External links
Noctuinae (Noctuidae) collection of Siberian Zoological Museum

Euxoa
Insects of Turkey
Moths described in 1900